Eric Branford Powell (born November 16, 1979) is a former American football defensive end. He was signed by the Green Bay Packers as an undrafted free agent in 2003. He played college football at Florida State.

Powell has also been a member of the Cologne Centurions, Detroit Lions, Buffalo Bills, and Houston Texans.

College career
After graduation from Jones High School in Orlando, Powell attended Southwest Mississippi Community College. While at Southwest, Powell was named the number one junior college defensive end in the country by ESPN the Magazine. His success at Southwest led to a scholarship to play at Florida State. In Orlando, September, 2001, Powell was shot by a small caliber handgun.  He did not sustain any life-threatening injuries.  He returned to Florida State to continue his academic and athletic career.

Professional career

Green Bay Packers
After going undrafted in the 2003 NFL Draft, Powell signed with the Green Bay Packers on May 2, 2003.

In 2004, he was allocated to NFL Europe and played for the Cologne Centurions.

Cologne Centurions
Powell was drafted by the Cologne Centurions in the fourth round of the 2005 NFL Europe Free Agent Draft.

Florida Tuskers
Powell was drafted by the Florida Tuskers on the UFL Premiere Season Draft in 2009 and signed with the team on September 3. He was released on September 29. He was originally re-signed to the teams' practice squad. Before the first game of the season the UFL abolished the practice squad and Powell became a member of the Tuskers' active roster.

References

External links
Just Sports Stats
Florida State Seminoles bio 
Houston Texans bio

1979 births
Living people
Jones High School (Orlando, Florida) alumni
Players of American football from Orlando, Florida
American football defensive ends
Florida State Seminoles football players
Green Bay Packers players
Cologne Centurions (NFL Europe) players
Detroit Lions players
Buffalo Bills players
Houston Texans players
Florida Tuskers players